This is a list of all the lists of rocket launches. That is, a list of articles that are lists of rocket launches.

Lists of rocket launches by rocket
 List of Antares launches
 List of Ariane launches
 List of Atlas launches
 List of Black Brant launches
 List of Delta IV Heavy launches
 List of Delta IV Medium launches
 List of Electron rocket launches
 List of failed Thor and Delta launches
 List of Falcon 9 and Falcon Heavy launches
 List of H-I and H-II launches
 List of Launch Services Program launches
 List of Long March launches
 List of Minotaur launches
 List of Proton launches
 List of PSLV launches
 List of R-7 launches
 List of Starship launches
 List of Thor and Delta launches
 List of Titan launches
 List of V-2 test launches
 List of Vega Launches
 List of Zenit launches

Lists of rocket launches by type
 List of failed SpaceX launches
 List of failed Thor and Delta launches
 List of NRO launches
 List of V-2 test launches
 Space jellyfish

Lists of rocket launches by location
 Chronology of Pakistan's rocket tests
 List of Satish Dhawan Space Centre launches

See also
 Lists of rockets
 List of rocket launch sites
 V-1 flying bomb facilities
 Timeline of spaceflight